Kasbar Sinabian (Born Istanbul, Ottoman Empire 1862 – died 1933) was a prominent military doctor and minister of the Ottoman Empire. He was of Armenian descent.

Life 
Kasbar Sinabian received his primary education in Kadıköy and soon thereafter he continued his studies at St. Lazzaro in Venice, Italy. He then attended the prestigious Murad Raphaelian Academy. From there on, he continued his studies at the Legal Academy in Paris.

When he returned to Istanbul, he became devoted to his legal career. In 1899 he was appointed by the Ottoman government to become legal counsel to the Ministry of Forest, Mines and Agriculture. In 1907 he served as the Deputy Minister of the Ottoman Sultan’s Personal State Coffers Ministry. In 1911, he received an invitation from Grand Vizier Kuçuk Sait Paşa to assume the post of Minister for Forests, Mines and Agriculture. However, at the beginning of the Armenian genocide, he resigned all ministry-ship and turned down all future invitations to work in the Ottoman government.

References

Armenian politicians
Politicians of the Ottoman Empire
Armenian physicians
1933 deaths
1862 births
Lawyers from Istanbul
Armenians from the Ottoman Empire
Physicians from the Ottoman Empire